David Affengruber may refer to:

David Affengruber (footballer, born 1992), SKU Amstetten goalkeeper
David Affengruber (footballer, born 2001), FC Liefering forward